Diogo Marques Izata Pereira (born 6 January 1997) is a Portuguese professional footballer who plays as a midfielder for FC Brașov.

Career
Izata made his Taça da Liga debut for Vilafranquense on 28 July 2019 in a game against Casa Pia.

References

External links

1997 births
Living people
Sportspeople from Leiria District
Portuguese footballers
Association football midfielders
Portugal youth international footballers
U.D. Vilafranquense players
CS Gaz Metan Mediaș players
FC Koper players
FC Brașov (2021) players
Campeonato de Portugal (league) players
Liga Portugal 2 players
Liga I players
Liga II players
Slovenian PrvaLiga players
Portuguese expatriate footballers
Portuguese expatriate sportspeople in Romania
Expatriate footballers in Romania
Portuguese expatriate sportspeople in Slovenia
Expatriate footballers in Slovenia